Amalia Fuentes (born Amalia Amador Muhlach; August 27, 1940 – October 5, 2019) was a Filipino actress who reigned as the "Queen of Philippine Movies" in the 1960s and 1970s. She was once dubbed as the "Elizabeth Taylor of the Philippines". She was the aunt of actors Aga Muhlach and Niño Muhlach and the mother of actress Liezl Martinez. She was the first Filipino Lux Soap model.

She produced and starred in her own films in the 1960s to the end of the 1970s. Her movies were big moneymakers making her the highest paid movie actress of her generation and a certified Movie and Box Office Queen. She later starred in productions by Viva Films (My Only Love), together with Sharon Cuneta, Gabby Concepcion and Jackie Lou Blanco. She also starred in later Regal Films such as Asawa Ko Huwag Mong Agawin, starring Vilma Santos, Eddie Guttierrez and Gabby Concepcion.

Career
In 1956, Fuentes and fellow actor Juancho Gutierrez won Sampaguita Pictures' Mr. & Ms. Number One contest. Sampaguita Pictures launched Amalia and Juancho into full stardom in the 1956 film Movie Fan. They were initially paired as a "love team" – popular in Philippine cinema –  by Sampaguita Pictures, and both starred in Rodora (1956), Sonata (1957), Pakiusap (1959), Ang Senyorito at Ang Atsay (1963) among others. She was also paired as love team with Romeo Vasquez in Pretty Boy (1957), Bobby (1958), Ako Ang May Sala (1958) and Bilanggong Birhen (1960) among others.

She starred in such notable films as, Estela Mondragon (1960) starring Carmen Rosales, Amy, Susie, Tessie (1960) with Susan Roces, Tessie Agana, Joey, Eddie, Lito (1961) starring Jose Mari Gonzales, Eddie Gutierrez, Lito Legaspi, Dayukdok (1961) with Carmen Rosales, Luis Gonzales, Barbara Perez and Amaliang Mali-Mali (1962) with Luis Gonzales.

Fuentes wrote the screenplay for the films Tatlong Kasaysayan Ng Pag-ibig (1966), and Ito Ang Aming Kasunduan (1973). She starred in and directed Mga Reynang Walang Trono (1976). Fuentes has her own production company, AM (Amalia Muhlach) Productions. She produced several movies, most notable of which are:  Whisper to the Wind (1966), Baril at Rosaryo (1967), and ''Pwede Ako Pwede Ka Pa Ba?(1976). The Philippine Movie Queen's last acting appearance was the ABS CBN hit teleserye Huwag Ka Lang Mawawala (2013) with Judy Ann Santos.

She won Best Actress Awards from Famas in 1966 for Ibulong Mo Sa Hangin and in the 1973 Manila Film Festival for the movie Pagibig Mo Buhay Ko!

Fuentes was a member of the Movie and Television Review and Classification Board (MTRCB). She appeared in more than 130 films.

Personal life
Fuentes was born Amalia Amador Muhlach in Bicol.  She was educated in Catholic schools.

After retiring from films in 2013, she suffered a stroke while on vacation in South Korea.

Her father died during the war and as the eldest child, she became the family breadwinner. Her two younger brothers, Alex and Alvaro, are also actors. Amalia married fellow actor Romeo Vasquez in 1965 in Hong Kong but they separated in 1969. They had a daughter, Liezl Sumilang (wife of actor Albert Martinez). After her divorce from Vasquez, Amalia married Joey Stevens, an American businessman with whom she adopted a son, Geric Stevens. She divorced Stevens after 28 years of marriage, citing infidelity. Stevens died in 2012.

Death
Fuentes died on October 5, 2019, due to cardiac arrest and multiple organ failures.

Awards & nominations

Filmography

Television

Movies

References

External links

1940 births
2019 deaths
20th-century Filipino actresses
21st-century Filipino actresses
Actresses from Camarines Sur
Filipino film actresses
Filipino people of American descent
Filipino people of Chinese descent
Filipino people of German descent
Filipino people of Spanish descent
Amalia
People from Naga, Camarines Sur
Burials at the Loyola Memorial Park